Jordon Craft (born November 10, 1993) is a Canadian curler from Saint John, New Brunswick.

Career
Craft won the 2014 New Brunswick Junior Curling Championship. He played with Rene Comeau, Daniel Wenzek and Ryan Freeze at the 2014 Canadian Junior Curling Championships. They finished the round robin with a 5–1 record and the championship pool with a 7–3 record, qualifying them for the semifinal. They breezed past Alberta to face Manitoba in the gold medal game. The teams were even in percentages however Manitoba had a key steal of four which was ultimately the difference in the game. New Brunswick earned the silver medal.

Teams

References

External links

Curlers from New Brunswick
Living people
1993 births
Canadian male curlers
Sportspeople from Saint John, New Brunswick